Tres muchachas de Jalisco is a 1964 Mexican musical comedy film produced and directed by Emilio Gómez Muriel, and starring Elvira Quintana, Flor Silvestre, and María Duval in the leading roles.

Cast
 Elvira Quintana as Elvira
 Flor Silvestre as Flor
 María Duval as María
 Álvaro Zermeño as Manuel
 Carlos López Moctezuma as don Pepe
 León Michel as Mauricio
 Chucho Salinas as Apolonio
 Adolfo Garza as Álvaro
 Sofía Álvarez as doña Lupe

References

External links
 
 Tres muchachas de Jalisco at the Instituto Mexicano de Cinematografía

1964 musical comedy films
1964 films
Mexican musical comedy films
1960s Mexican films